Kalia Antoniou (born 6 April 2000) is a Cypriot swimmer. She competed in the women's 50 metre backstroke event at the 2017 World Aquatics Championships.

In 2019, she won four silver medals at the Games of the Small States of Europe held in Budva, Montenegro. In 2019, she also represented Cyprus at the World Aquatics Championships held in Gwangju, South Korea. She competed in the women's 50 metre freestyle and women's 100 metre freestyle events. In both events she did not advance to compete in the semi-finals.

References

External links
 Alabama Crimson Tide bio
 

2000 births
Living people
Female backstroke swimmers
Cypriot female freestyle swimmers
Cypriot female swimmers
European Games competitors for Cyprus
Swimmers at the 2015 European Games
Swimmers at the 2018 Summer Youth Olympics
Swimmers at the 2018 Mediterranean Games
Swimmers at the 2022 Mediterranean Games
Mediterranean Games gold medalists for Cyprus
Mediterranean Games bronze medalists for Cyprus
Mediterranean Games medalists in swimming
Swimmers at the 2020 Summer Olympics
Olympic swimmers of Cyprus
21st-century Cypriot women